Ellas Cantan Así is a compilation album by Mexican singer Alejandra Guzmán. It is the first album to include the song "Vive el Mundial" written by Mexican producer Aureo Baqueiro.

Track listing
Angeles Caídos — 5:10
Corazones Rotos (Edit) — 3:16
Cuenta Conmigo (Edit) — 3:26
Dime Adiós (Edit) — 2:56
Despertar — 4:52
Eternamente Bella (Edit) — 2:51
Guante de Seda — 3:33
Guera — 4:32
Hacer el Amor con Otro — 4:40
Te Esperaba — 3:56
Mala Hierba — 4:15
Mírala, Míralo — 4:03
No Hay Vacuna Contra el Amor — 3:11
Pasa la Vida — 3:38
Reina de Corazones (Edit) — 3:09
Toda la Mitad — 3:47
Vive el Mundial (Liguilla Mix) — 3:07
Set Acústico: Llama Por Favor/Rosas Rojas/Cuidado Con el Corazón — 6:25
Diablo — 3:25

2003 greatest hits albums
Alejandra Guzmán compilation albums